Mzuvukile Tom (born 17 April 1982 in Graaff-Reinet) is a South African football (soccer) defender and midfielder who spent most of his career with Golden Arrows. He was capped twice for South Africa.

External links

1982 births
Living people
People from Graaff-Reinet
South African soccer players
Soccer players from the Eastern Cape
Lamontville Golden Arrows F.C. players
Mpumalanga Black Aces F.C. players
Association football midfielders
Association football defenders
South Africa international soccer players
National First Division players
South African Premier Division players